RMS Pannonia was a transatlantic Cunard Liner that was built in Scotland in 1902 and scrapped in Germany in 1922.

Building
Furness Withy ordered the ship from John Brown & Company of Clydebank, Glasgow, but Cunard bought her before her launch on 5 September 1902. She was a twin-screw steamer, with a pair of three-cylinder triple-expansion engines whose combined rating was 811 NHP.

Career
On 15 May 1903 Pannonia began her maiden voyage, which was from Trieste via Fiume and Palermo to New York City. Her Master from 1 January 1911 until January 1912 was Captain Arthur Rostron, who later rescued survivors of RMS Titanic. He was succeeded by Captain Robert Capper, under whose command in November 1913 Pannonia rescued 103 passengers from the Spanish steamship Balmes, which was on fire. In May 1916 Pannonia became a troop ship, carrying troops from Canada to France.

Pannonia left New York for the last time on 18 April 1922, calling at Plymouth and Cherbourg and ending her crossing at Hamburg. There she was laid up until she was sold for scrap on 9 October.

References

1902 ships
Ocean liners of the United Kingdom
Ships of the Cunard Line
Ships built on the River Clyde
Steamships of the United Kingdom
Troop ships of the United Kingdom
World War I passenger ships of the United Kingdom